Barbara Ann Reynolds (born August 17, 1942) is an African-American journalist and author of a notable biography of Jesse Jackson, Jesse Jackson, the Man, the Myth, and the Movement, published in 1975.

Career 
She has written for the Cleveland Press, Ebony magazine, Chicago Today, and the Chicago Tribune, were she served as the Washington correspondent until 1980. While at the Tribune she covered Jesse Jackson, with whom she at first had a close friendship.  Later her relationship with Jackson took a more journalistic and professional tone, and she published the controversial and sometimes critical biography, which she later revisited as Jesse Jackson, America's David. She contributed a regular column to USA Today until 1996. Amongst other books, she wrote And Still We Rise: Interviews with 50 Black Role Models. In 1998, she released No, I Won’t Shut Up: 30 Years of Telling It Like It Is, that included a foreword by Coretta Scott King. In 2005, she published an autobiography, Out of Hell and Living Well.

Along with writing about social issues that interest her, Reynolds currently serves as a Pentecostal minister in Washington, D.C.

Personal life 
Reynolds was raised Catholic, attending St Cyprian School and Church in Columbus.

References

Terry, Wallace. Missing Pages: Black Journalists of Modern America: An Oral History (2007) Carroll & Graf

External links

Reverend Dr. Barbara Reynolds, The History Makers, Interview date June 30, 2005, retrieved June 24, 2020
Interview: A Word on Words; 2621; Barbara Reynolds, 1998, Nashville Public Radio, American Archive of Public Broadcasting (WGBH and the Library of Congress)

1942 births
Living people
American women journalists
African-American women writers
American Pentecostal pastors
African-American Catholics
Former Roman Catholics
21st-century African-American people
21st-century African-American women
20th-century African-American people
20th-century African-American women